Grünwald (transliterated Gruenwald) is German for "green forest" and may refer to:

Places
 Grünwald, Austria, town in Aigen-Schlägl municipality, Rohrbach, Austria
 Grünwald, Bavaria, municipality south of Munich, Germany

People
 Alfred Grünwald (librettist) (1884–1951), Austrian librettist 
 Béla Iványi-Grünwald (1867–1940), Hungarian painter
 Béla Grünwald (1839–1891), Hungarian politician and historian
 Géza Grünwald (1910–1943), Hungarian mathematician
 Johannes Theodor Baargeld (1892–1927; legal name: Alfred Emanuel Ferdinand Grünwald), German painter and poet
 Mark Gruenwald (1953–1996), American comic book writer
 Malchiel Gruenwald (1882–1958), Israeli hotelier, amateur journalist and stamp collector
 Sidonie Grünwald-Zerkowitz (1852–1907), Austro-Hungarian writer, translator and fashion designer

See also
 Greenwald
 Grunwald (disambiguation)
 Grünewald (disambiguation)
 Battle of Grunwald